mozdev.org was a website that offered free project hosting, and software development tools to the Mozilla community. Site hosted extensions for Firefox, Thunderbird and SeaMonkey and stand-alone Mozilla-based applications. It was free to set up a project there, but all development must have been done using a license approved by the OSI. According to the site, at one point it hosted over 250 active projects. It was shut down in July 2020 and currently redirects to mozilla.org.

See also 

 mozilla.org
 MDN Web Docs

References

Mozilla
Project hosting websites
Internet properties established in 2000
Internet_properties_disestablished_in_2020
Discontinued_open-source_software_hosting_facilities